Fiorenzo Fiorentini (10 April 1920 – 27 March 2003) was an Italian actor, author, composer, screenwriter and radio personality.

Life and career 
Born in Rome, Fiorentini began his career as an author and radio actor, creating many successful macchiette (i.e. comic monologues caricaturing stock characters). He made his stage debut in 1954, in the revue Tutto fa Broadway. He later focused his stage activity on plays and shows related to Roman culture, often collaborating with Mario Scaccia. In 1980 he founded the Ettore Petrolini Study Centre in Rome.

Fiorentini appeared in numerous films, mostly comedies, sometimes even collaborating on the screenplays. He was also a television author and actor, a singer and a successful composer. He died from the after-effects of an intracerebral hemorrhage.

Partial filmography
 
 Maracatumba... ma non è una rumba! (1949) - sor du fodere', l'intrattenitore
 Anthony of Padua (1949, writer)
 Viva il cinema! (1952) - Tonino
 A Mother Returns (1952, writer)
 Giovinezza (1952, writer)
 Good Folk's Sunday (1953) - Vincenzo
 Ci troviamo in galleria (1953) - Pippo
 Café chantant (1953) - Se stesso / Himself
 Cento serenate (1954) - Don Alfonso detto Fofò
 Le vacanze del sor Clemente (1955) - Mr. Cheri
 I pinguini ci guardano (1956)
 The Traffic Policeman (1960) - Padre di Otello (voice, uncredited)
 Parigi o cara (1962) - Claudio Nesti
 Carmen di Trastevere (1962) - Carmen's Guitar Player
 Canzoni a tempo di twist (1962)
 The Monk of Monza (1963) - Smilzo, un bravo
 Gli onorevoli (1963) - Professore
 I ragazzi dell'hully-gully (1964)
 Lo scippo (1965)
 How We Robbed the Bank of Italy (1966) - Romoletto, detto 'Il Genio del Male'
 Non faccio la guerra, faccio l'amore (1966)
 The Tiger and the Pussycat (1967) - Tazio
 Soldati e capelloni (1967) - Direttore del locale notturno
 Play-Boy (1967) - Tailor
 Il profeta (1968) - Luigi
 Donne... botte e bersaglieri (1968) - Porter
 The Black Sheep (1968) - Bertieri
 The Two Crusaders (1968) - Ciccio counselor
 Il ragazzo che sorride (1969) - House-painter
 Zenabel (1969) - Cecco
 Gli infermieri della mutua (1969) - Marchese Renostowski
 Oh dolci baci e languide carezze (1970)
 La ragazza del prete (1970)
 I due maggiolini più matti del mondo (1970) - Il Giglio
 Er Più – storia d'amore e di coltello (1971) - Ignazio, il 'frascataro'
 Storia di fifa e di coltello - Er seguito d'er più (1972) - Er Frascataro
 Anche se volessi lavorare, che faccio? (1972) - Pasquina's Uncle
 La Tosca (1973) - Spoletta
 Teresa the Thief (1973) - Alvaro - Ciancastorta
 La notte dell'ultimo giorno (1973)
 Buona parte di Paolina (1973)
 Farfallon (1974) - Leonardo
 Tutto in comune (1974)
 Che notte quella notte! (1977) - Bernardino
 La soldatessa alla visita militare (1977) - Warrant Officer at the depot
 Ride bene... chi ride ultimo (1977) - Cardinal (segment "Prete per forza")
 Last Feelings (1978) - Anselmo
 Tanto va la gatta al lardo... (1978) - Friend of Dino / Oreste
 Ridendo e scherzando (1978) - Peppino
 Ciao cialtroni! (1979)
 L'assistente sociale tutto pepe (1981) - 'Monsignore'
 La Storia (1986, TV Movie) - Cucchiarelli
 Captain Fracassa's Journey (1990) - Pietro
 Only You (1994) - Old Man
 Un bugiardo in paradiso (1998)
 The Missing (1999) - Cardinal Valetti
 Gente di Roma (2003)

References

External links 

1920 births
2003 deaths
Male actors from Rome
Musicians from Rome
Italian male stage actors
Italian male film actors
Italian male television actors
Italian male composers
Italian male screenwriters
Italian radio personalities
20th-century Italian male actors
20th-century Italian male musicians
20th-century Italian male writers
20th-century Italian screenwriters
20th-century Italian composers